The Miss Kansas' Teen competition is the pageant that selects the representative for the U.S. state of Kansas in the Miss America's Teen pageant.

Niomi Ndirangu of El Dorado was crowned Miss Kansas' Outstanding Teen on March 27, 2022 at Liberty Middle School in Pratt, Kansas. She competed for the title of Miss America's Outstanding Teen 2023 at the Hyatt Regency Dallas in Dallas, Texas on August 12, 2022, where she was named the National Fundraiser Winner. 

In January of 2023, the official name of the pageant was changed from Miss Kansas’ Outstanding Teen, to Miss Kansas’ Teen, in accordance with the national pageant.

Results summary 
The year in parentheses indicates year of Miss America's Outstanding Teen competition the award/placement was garnered.

Awards

Preliminary awards 
 Preliminary Lifestyle and Fitness: Kristen Boxman (2014)

Non-finalist Awards 
 Non-finalist Talent: Taylor Clark (2018)

Other awards 
 Outstanding Instrumental Talent: Taylor Clark (2018)
 Random Acts of Kindness: Paige Kauffman (2017)
 Miracle Maker Runner-Up, raising $17,000 for Children's Miracle Network Hospitals: Tori Pedruzzi (2020)
 National Fundraiser Winner: Niomi Ndirangu (2023)

Winners

References

External links
 Official website

Kansas
Kansas culture
Women in Kansas
Annual events in Kansas